Abbasabad (also Romanized as ‘Abbāsābād) is a village in Pain Velayat Rural District, in the Central District of Taybad County, Razavi Khorasan Province, Iran. At the 2006 census, its population was 67, in 13 families.

See also 

 List of cities, towns and villages in Razavi Khorasan Province

References 

Populated places in Taybad County